Claude Blanchard (May 19, 1932 – August 20, 2006) was a Québécois pop singer and actor.

Partial filmography
Gina (1975) - Bob Sauvageau
Mustang (1975) - 
Fantastica (1980) - Hector
Jesus of Montreal (1989) - Policeman
Rafales (1990) - Armand Pouliot
Montreal Stories (1991) - Quesnel (segment "Toile du temps, La")
Nénette (1991)
Omerta (1996-1999, TV Series) - Roger Perreault
Virginie (1996-2006, TV Series) - Pierre Boivin
Now or Never (Aujourd'hui ou jamais) (1998) - Napoleon

References

External links
 

1932 births
2006 deaths
Canadian male film actors
Canadian male television actors
Male actors from Quebec
Musicians from Quebec
20th-century Canadian male musicians